Ministry of Ecology and Natural Resources may refer to:

 Ministry of Ecology and Natural Resources (Ukraine)
 Ministry of Ecology and Natural Resources (Azerbaijan)